Veendum Kannur is a 2012 Malayalam political thriller film directed by Haridas, starring Anoop Menon in the lead role. The film is touted as a sequel to the director's own 1997 film Kannur although the characters do not resemble. Veendum Kannur is about how one man sets out to bring about a revolution in the communist party.

Plot
The film is set in Kannur, a veritable killing field for political rivals of different hues. Jayakrishnan is the son of the Communist Party Secretary Madayi Surendran who is averse to any progress funded by multinational corporations. Jayakrishnan, a Jawaharlal Nehru University product who believes in non violent political ideology, don't like the way politics is practised and had once left the state disheartened with the developments. He is them goes to Agra and works as a guide for the Taj Mahal archaeological department. He returns to Kannur and falls in love with Radhika, who happens to be the daughter of Divakaran, Surendran's biggest political rival. Jayakrishnan's political views and this love affair leads to direct confrontation between the father and his more 'modern' son.

Jayakrishnan, on his return, is given high security because of being the son of the party secretary, but is physically attacked by members of the opposition party on the very day of his arrival, which result in a child losing her limbs in a bomb blast. This flare up the fights between different party members of the district. Jayakrishnan finds his social sensibilities awakened all on a sudden, and he comes up with a unique plan that leads to the birth of the New Communist. Within no time, followers to the New Communist turn up in thousands, and Jayakrishnan faces stringent opposition as well. As the movement gain detractors and supporters from far and wide with his pages in Facebook and Twitter getting tons of hits, Jayakrishnan also opens up his development agenda as he starts to support the fabric corridor project proposed by a young industrialist named Mohit Nambiar which is expected to give a fresh development initiatives for the men of Kannur. The Party fights it while Jayakrishnan offers it all support.

Cast

Production
The film was shot in Kannur, Ernakulam and Ottappallam and completed in about 25 days. Haridas says the message of the film is that success could be achieved only through forgiveness and truth.

Reviews
The film was panned by critics and audiences alike. A review by City Journal said, "If Veendum Kannur is a thriller, it is a lacklustre one, which will neither excite nor move the audience." Aswin J. Kumar of The Times of India said, "Even with the abundance of thriller elements, the movie fails to grip the audience for it relies heavily on Anoop Menon, who is heavily loaded with dialogues which he renders at a rapid pace and with vigour." Veeyen of Nowrunning.com gave the movie a  rating and commented, "I thought we were already done with such stale political capers that ruled the roost long, very long back! Looks like that's not the case, unfortunately!" Contrastingly, IBN Live gave the movie an "average" rating and said, "'Veendum Kannur' has some lack luster moments, but manages to qualify for a one time watch."

The film released in about 38 theatres across Kerala on 8 June 2012. In spite of poor reviews from the audiences and critics, the director says the film is doing well and he is planning to release it in another 22 theatres on 15 June. He added that a special screening of the film would soon be conducted for the members of the legislative assembly soon.

References

External links
 

2010s Malayalam-language films
Indian political thriller films
Films about communism
Indian sequel films
QKannur2
Films shot in Kannur
Films shot in Ottapalam
Films shot in Kochi
Films directed by K. K. Haridas